

Rear wheel drive cars

Front wheel drive cars

Trucks

See also
Chrysler
DeSoto
Dodge
Eagle
Imperial
Jeep
Plymouth
List of Chrysler vehicles
List of Jeep vehicles
:Category:Automobile platforms

External links
 

Chrysler platforms